Muhammad Ali Syarief Alkatiri (born 26 October 1996), also known as Aliando or Aliando Syarief, is an Indonesian actor, singer, songwriter. He has Arab descent from his father, Syarief Alkatiri, and his mother, Tengku Resi Refado (Resi Revando), is from Minangkabau.

Biography
Muhammad Ali Syarief was born in Jakarta, Indonesia, on 26 October 1996. He is the fourth child of four siblings of Syarief Alkatiri and Tengku Resi Revado. Syarief began his career in entertainment at the age of 12 with a part as an extra in the TV movie Si Gundul Bocah Petir. His mother was one of the actresses. In Ganteng Ganteng Serigala, he played the role of a vampire. He became popular in feature films with the release of Garuda di Dadaku 2 in 2011. In addition to his movie roles, Ali has also had roles in soap operas, playing in Bara Bere and ABG Jadi Manten.

In 2015, he joined the musical group The Freaks, which also includes Nikita Willy, Teuku Rassya, and Calvin Jeremy. Their single "Jatuh Cinta Tak Ada Logika", a collaboration with Agnez Mo is a mash-up of her two songs "Ku T'lah Jatuh Cinta" and "Tak Ada Logika".

Discography

Singles

Filmography

Films

Television

Television films
 Si Gundul Bocah Petir (TPI)
 Cinta Monyet Di Kantin Sekolah (Trans TV)
 Komisi Pemberantasan Setan (Trans TV)
 Petaka Homeschooling (Trans TV)
 12:12 (Trans TV)
 Headphone Suara Hati (Trans TV)
 Kukibarkan Benderaku (Trans TV)
 Yuk Kita Sekolah (Trans TV)
 Persada Langit Biru (Global TV)
 Kisah Rama dan Shinta (Indosiar)
 Lolly Love (Trans TV)
 Badil dan Blangkon Ajaib (SCTV)

Awards and nominations

Host 
 HUT SCTV 24 (SCTV)
 JKT48 Finding Idol (2nd season) (NET.)

References

External links
 

21st-century Indonesian male singers
Indonesian male voice actors
Indonesian people of Yemeni descent
Minangkabau people
1996 births
Male actors from Jakarta
Living people
Singers from Jakarta
Tenors